Marcello Squarcialupi (Piombino c. 1538-Alba Iulia 1599) was an Italian physician, astronomer, and Protestant exile in Basel, then a Unitarian exile in Transylvania. His works included De cometis dissertationes novae clarissimae (New Clear Essays On Comets) Basel, 1580. From Poschiavo, 1587, he wrote to the Senate in Alba Iulia, though it is uncertain whether the letter was ever delivered.

References

1530s births
1599 deaths
16th-century Italian astronomers
Italian Unitarians
Unitarian Church of Transylvania